Albert Wolfgang may refer to:

 Albert Wolfgang, Count of Hohenlohe-Langenburg (1659–1715)
 Albert Wolfgang, Count of Schaumburg-Lippe (1699–1748)
 Albert Wolfgang of Brandenburg-Bayreuth (1689–1734)